Dala or Dalla Township is located on the southern bank of Yangon river across from downtown Yangon, Myanmar. The township, made up of 23 wards and 23 village track (including 50 villages), is bounded by the Yangon river in the north and east, the Twante Canal in the west, and Twante Township in the south.

History 
In 1805, Alaungpaya's fourth son King Bodawpaya appointed Htaw Lay as the governor (myoza) of Dala (modern Dala and Twante). 

During the colonial era, Dalla was the site of the major shipyard of the Irrawaddy Flotilla Company.

Contemporary 
Despite its strategic location near Yangon, the township is still largely rural and undeveloped mainly because it still lacks a bridge across the Yangon river, with connections between the township and the city being by ferry only. A bridge project was announced for 2017, with an MOU signed with a Korean company, however no building work had begun by June 2019. Dalla has 30 primary schools and two high schools.

References

Townships of Yangon
Old Cities of Mon people